The Ministry of Justice is a government ministry office of the Syrian Arab Republic, responsible for judicial affairs in Syria.

List of ministers (Post-1920 when Kingdom of Syria was proclaimed)
Jalal al-Zahdi (March 1920 – September 1920)
Badih Mu'ayyad al-Azm (September 1920 – June 1922)
Ata Bey al-Ayyubi (June 1922 – May 1926)
Yusuf al-Hakim (May 1926 – February 1928)
Zaki al-Khatib (February 1928 – November 1931)
Mazhar Raslan (June 1932 – June 1933) [referred to as the Minister of Justice and Education]
Suleiman Jokhadar (June 1933 – May 1934)
Ata Bey al-Ayyubi (May 1934 – February 1936)
Said al-Ghazzi (February 1936 – December 1936)
Abd al-Rahman al-Kayyali (21 December 1936 – 18 February 1939)
Nasib al-Bakri (24 February 1939 – 5 April 1939)
Khalid al-Azm (5 April 1939 – 8 July 1939)
Khalil Raf'a (8 July 1939 – 3 April 1941)
Safwat Ibrahim (3 April 1941 – September 1941)
Zaki al-Khatib (September 1941 – 17 April 1942)
Ragheb Kikhia (17 April 1942 – 25 March 1943)
Faydi al-Atasi (25 March 1943 – 19 August 1943) [referred to as the Minister of Social Affairs, Justice, and Education]
Abd al-Rahman al-Kayyali (19 August 1943 – 5 April 1945)
Said al-Ghazzi (5 April 1945 – 26 August 1945)
Sabri al-Asali (26 August 1945 – 27 April 1946)
Khalid al-Azm (27 April 1946 – 28 December 1946)
Na'im Antaki (28 December 1946 – 16 April 1947) [resigned]
Adnan al-Atasi (16 April 1947 – 6 October 1947)
Ahmad al-Rifai (6 October 1947 – 23 August 1948)
Said al-Ghazzi (23 August 1948 – 12 December 1948)
Ahmad al-Rifai (12 December 1948 – 17 April 1949)
As'ad Kurani (17 April 1949 – 17 August 1949)
Sami Kabbara (17 August 1949 – 28 December 1949)
Faydi al-Atasi (28 December 1949 – 4 June 1950)
Zaki al-Khatib (4 June 1950 – 9 August 1951)
Abdul Aziz Hassan (9 August 1951 – 13 November 1951)
Hamid Naji (13 November 1951 – 9 June 1952)
Munir Ghanim (9 June 1952 – 19 July 1953)
Asad Muhsin (19 July 1953 – 1 March 1954)
Izzat al-Saqqal (1 March 1954 – 19 June 1954)
As'ad Kurani (19 June 1954 – 3 November 1954)
Ali Bozo (3 November 1954 – 13 February 1955)
Maamun al-Kuzbari (1955)
Munir al-Ajlani (1955-1956)
Akram al-Hawrani (1958-1960)
Fathallah Allush (1966-1967)
Ihsan Subaynati (1968)
Ibrahim Hamzawi (1969-1970)
Adib al-Nahawi (1972-1980)
Khalid Malki (1980-1985)
Sha'ban Shahin (1986-1987)
Khalid al-Ansari (1987–1993)
Abdullah Tulba (1993-1994)
Hussein Hassun (1994-2000)
Muhammad Nabil al-Khatib (2000–September 10, 2003)
 Nizar Al Isa (September 18, 2003 – April 10, 2004)
Muhammad Al Ghafri (April 10, 2004 – April 23, 2009)
Ahmad Younes (April 23, 2009 – March 29, 2011)
Tayseer Qala Awwad (April 14, 2011 – August 16, 2012)
Najm Hamad Al Ahmad (August 16, 2012 – March 29, 2017)
Hisham Al Shaar (March 29, 2017 – 30 August 2020)
Ahmad al-Sayyed (August 30, 2020 – present)

See also
Cabinet of Syria
Justice ministry
Politics of Syria

External links
Ministry of Justice

References

Syria
Justice
Judiciary of Syria